Volodymyr Maksymovych Levchenko (18 February 1944 in Kyiv – April 2006) was a Soviet Ukrainian footballer.

Honours
 Soviet Top League winner: 1966, 1967, 1968.
 Soviet Cup winner: 1964, 1966.

International career
He earned 3 caps for the USSR national football team, and participated in UEFA Euro 1968.

External links
Profile 

1944 births
2006 deaths
Ukrainian footballers
Soviet footballers
Soviet Union international footballers
UEFA Euro 1968 players
Soviet Top League players
FC Dynamo Kyiv players
Association football defenders
Footballers from Kyiv